Shovel Mountain is an unincorporated community in Burnet County, Texas, United States. According to the Handbook of Texas, the community had an estimated population of 98 in 2000.

History
The area in what is known as Shovel Mountain today was first settled in the mid-1850s and may have gotten this name when a settler found a shovel at the summit of a nearby hill shortly after the American Civil War. A post office was established at Shovel Mountain in 1869 and remained in operation until 1905. Ottilie Giesecke served as postmistress. Its population was 40 in 1884, 60 in 1890, and 75 in 1892. Farmers in the area shipped cotton and wool and the majority of residents were sheep farmers. It then began to decline at the turn of the 20th century. Mail was sent to the community from Marble Falls. Several scattered houses remained in the 1940s and disappeared in the 1980s. Its population was 98 in 2000.

Geography

Education
Shovel Mountain is served by the Marble Falls Independent School District when its school joined it in 1949 and was on county maps during that decade.

References

Unincorporated communities in Burnet County, Texas
Unincorporated communities in Texas